Filippos Kalogiannidis (born May 15, 1994) is a Greek professional basketball player who last played for Kolossos Rodou of the Greek Basket League. He is a 1.93 m (6 ft 4 in) tall point guard.

Professional career
Kalogiannidis began his pro career with the Greek League club Maroussi, in the 2010–11 season. After two years with the club, he joined Ermis Lagkada of the Greek A2 Basket League. After three years with Ermis, he joined Aries Trikala, for the 2015–16 season.

After also three years with the club, he left in 2018 and joined Rethymno Cretan Kings of the Greek Basket League. The next year, he joined Kolossos Rodou.

References

External links
FIBA Profile (archive)
FIBA Europe Profile
Eurobasket.com Profile
RealGM.com Profile

1994 births
Living people
Aries Trikala B.C. players
Greek Basket League players
Greek men's basketball players
Maroussi B.C. players
Point guards
Rethymno B.C. players
Shooting guards
Basketball players from Thessaloniki